Nokian Panimo Oy (known as Pirkanmaan Uusi Panimo / PUP Oy until 2004) is a brewery in Nokia, Finland, founded in 1991. The brewery produces beer, cider, mineral water and soft drinks.

The best known brand of the brewery is the Keisari line of beers.

The brewery also produces small runs of named beers on request.

External links
 Official site

Breweries in Finland